Bimberi, New South Wales is a civil parish of Cowley County, New South Wales. It includes the source of the Murrumbidgee River at Peppercorn Hill. It is in the Kosciuszko National Park and is uninhabited.

References

Localities in New South Wales
Parishes of Cowley County
Snowy Valleys Council